The Brightlights are a four-piece British indie rock band from Grimsby in North East Lincolnshire. They released their debut single, "Inspired By", on 5 November 2007. The single was produced by Feeder frontman Grant Nicholas.

Biography
The band have cited Arctic Monkeys, Morning Runner, Razorlight, Coldplay, The Kooks and Oasis as their influences - with Channel 4 Music describing them as "explosive melodic rock with a dark edge." They have been compared to the American indie rock band Kings of Leon.

They appeared on the V Festival's "Road to V" competition in the summer of 2007. They subsequently won the competition along with Ipswich band Rosalita. They went on to appear regularly on Freshly Squeezed & Channel 4 Music with Alexa Chung & Rick Edwards.

In September 2007, The Guardian newspaper featured them as their 'New Band of the Day'.

Releases
The Brightlights were the first established band signed to Distiller Records, a label owned by Samuel Dyson, son of James Dyson. They released their debut single, "Inspired By", on 7" vinyl and download on 5 November 2007. Reviews were generally favourable. The video for the single was filmed in the band's hometown of Grimsby on the eastern coast of England. It was directed by Jay Burridge who has also worked on a video for Hot Chip. It features Shane Meadows cult drama This Is Englands star  Thomas Turgoose.

Prolific DJs such as Zane Lowe, Colin Murray and Steve Lamacq have positively commented on the band's releases. Their first single entered the UK Indie Chart at No. 2 on 11 November 2007.

The Brightlights second single was titled "3". It reached the top 5 in the BBC Indie Charts beating both Kings Of Leon & Arctic Monkeys on weekly vinyl sales. The single was produced by Steve Power who is most well known for producing songs for Kylie Minogue , Robbie Williams and Blur at the Tower of Power Studios in London.

The Brightlights released their long lost album titled Make It Last 12 years after it was recorded. It was released on Supa Soka Records on August 7, 2020. The album was released by surprise without any single releases or pre promotion. Make It Last is one of the most unique indie releases of the decade, released as a debut album 12 years after the band disbanded, under the circumstances of the worldwide Pandemic COVID19. The album received positive reviews, often described as a "nostalgia album" and one independent review viewed this as being " one of the last great live albums to have been written" though, streams and sales were generally low and it didn't manage to repeat the successes of earlier releases.

Short Rise & Fall

In 2007, they became the poster boys of Richard Branson's new television project Virgin 1 and played at the launch party at his home in Oxfordshire with support from the band The Enemy.

In early 2008, the band began recording their first album at The Crypt Studio in London with engineer and producer Matt Sime , who is most well known for producing Feeder 's albums. That album has only recently been released 12 years after it was recorded.

The Brightlights were on the verge of becoming one of the biggest exports in modern UK guitar music and were one of the last bands to be offered a large five album deal advance by Jive/Zomba Records, before the label collapsed in 2011. However, the band were advised by management to hold out for bigger and better offers and in turn the deal was declined. Fashion writers Company Magazine printed a large two page article which predicted the band would become one of the biggest bands in the UK by 2012. Unfortunately, with the rapid descent of Indie guitar music, in conjunction with the decline of their most popular fanbase platform Myspace, the band were short lived and disbanded in late 2008. The band have since released interviews stating that silent struggles with mental health and well being amongst band members ultimately attributed to the bands demise and they dedicated their album to anybody who suffers mental health conditions. The Brightlights represent one of the quickest and most un-documented rise & fall stories in popular band culture of the early noughties.

There were rumours circulating on social media networks that the band may be organising a comeback gig. On the 18th November 2022, The Brighlights reformed for a special gig at KU Bar Stockton as part of their 20th Birthday celebrations.

Post Brightlights

Leon Blanchard & James Buxton went on to form a 4 piece band Venacava which were active between 2008 - 2010.

Adam Featherstone & Luke Parker went on to form a five piece band called Old Arcadians which were active between 2008 - 2010.

Other associated bands include Casanova, Little Fears & The Chaplins which all consisted of The Brightlights band members.

References

English rock music groups
English indie rock groups
Grimsby
Music in Lincolnshire